The 2005 Louisiana–Lafayette Ragin' Cajuns football team represents the University of Louisiana at Lafayette as a member of the Sun Belt Conference in the 2005 NCAA Division I-A football season. They were led by fourth-year head coach Rickey Bustle played their home games at Cajun Field in Lafayette, Louisiana.

The 2005 New Orleans Bowl, which was annually played in the Mercedes-Benz Superdome in New Orleans was tagged the "New Orleans Bowl at Lafayette" and moved to Cajun Field, the home stadium of Ragin' Cajuns football, in response to Hurricane Katrina that had destroyed the Superdome a few months earlier

Preseason

Sun Belt Media Day

Preseason Standings

Preseason All-Conference Team
Offense
WR Bill Sampy
OL Brandon Cox

Schedule

Game summaries

@ Texas

@ Eastern Michigan

Northwestern State

UCF

Florida Atlantic

@ Arkansas State

@ Middle Tennessee

Troy

@ North Texas

Florida International

@ Louisiana-Monroe

References

Louisiana-Lafayette
Louisiana Ragin' Cajuns football seasons
Sun Belt Conference football champion seasons
Louisiana-Lafayette Ragin' Cajuns football